Jakara is the name of:

 Dejan Jakara (born 1986), Slovenian basketball coach 
 Jakara Anthony (born 1998), Australian freestyle skier